Malaysia national under-19 football team (also known as Malaysia Under-19 or Malaysia U-19) represents Malaysia in international football competitions in AFF U-19 Youth Championship, AFC U-19 Championship and FIFA U-20 World Cup, as well as any other under-20 international football tournaments. The players in the current team mainly consist of players with age within 17 to 19 years old where the oldest players will be below the age requirement of 20 years old when the next U-20 tournament started. The team will also play in other age-restricted tournament as the older or younger side such as U-20 and U-18 when needed.

After the disbanded of Harimau Muda project, Football Association of Malaysia needed a fresh start for the U-19 team where a new set of players was brought in for the U-23 side with the creation of SEA Games Project 2017 team with the team mainly consist of players with age around 18 to 21 years old. The set of players that still under 19 years old can then also be selected to represent Malaysia for the U-20 side tournament with the Under 19 team.

History 
The team is considered to be the feeder team for the Malaysia national under-23 football team. It is for players aged 19 and less. Also in existence are national teams for Under-23s (Under-22s and Under-21s), Under-17s and Under-15s. As long as they are eligible, players can play at any level, hence it is possible for one to play for the U-19s, senior side and then again for the U-19s.

Harimau Muda Project era 
After the abysmal performance of Malaysia national football team in international scene, Football Association of Malaysia created Harimau Muda Project where the under-19 side was called to represent Malaysia as a single team club called Harimau Muda C.

Harimau Muda C was formed to provide a bigger pool of players and become a feeder team for Harimau Muda B, as Harimau Muda B did to Harimau Muda A. Harimau Muda C made their debut in the 3rd Division of Malaysian football, the FAM League and fielded under-18 aged players.

The team is aimed at developing Malaysian youth players and will not recruit any foreign nationals in its squad. By entering Harimau Muda C in domestic competitions, FAM hopes to expose top Malaysia under-19 players to competitive matches, thus helping them prepare for international tournaments. As such, Harimau Muda C is one of a small number of football clubs in the world which places an age-restrictions on team members while playing in a national professional league. Harimau Muda C played in the Malaysia FAM League from 2013 to 2015 season.

In 2015, Youth and Sports Minister Khairy Jamaluddin, former FAM’s Deputy President has stated that the Football Association of Malaysia must disband the Harimau Muda system, stating the Harimau Muda system is no longer relevant, it was not planned for the long term, and the state football associations should take the responsibility to groom potential players.

On 25 November 2015, it was confirmed that the Harimau Muda has disbanded by FAM which means all the player from Harimau Muda A, Harimau Muda B and Harimau Muda C will be returned to their own state team.

Revival of the team 
Since Harimau Muda Project was disbanded, the under-19 team enter hibernation state and only recently surfaced again as a formal under-19 national team instead of a club.

AFF U-19 Youth Championship 
Players was called up for international duty with the international selection as the team will represent the nation in the 2016 AFF U-19 Youth Championship in September 2016.

AFC U-19 Championship qualifying 
The team was not qualified for the 2016 edition.

FIFA U-20 World Cup qualifying 
The team was not qualified for the 2017 edition as they were already knock-out from 2016 AFC U-19 Championship qualification.

International records

FIFA World Youth Championship 

**Red border colour indicates tournament was held on home soil.

AFC Youth Championship 

**Red border colour indicates tournament was held on home soil.

AFF Youth Championship record 

**Red border colour indicates tournament was held on home soil.

Invited tournament

Results and fixtures

2022

Note
 1 : Non FIFA 'A' International match

Players 

The following 23 players were selected for 2023 AFC U-20 Asian Cup qualification.

Recent call-ups
The following players have been called up since 2019.

Top appearances 
As of matches on 14 July 2018.

Note: Club(s) represents the permanent clubs during the player's time in the Under-19s.

Top goalscorers 

Note: Club(s) represents the permanent clubs during the player's time in the Under-19s.

Captain history

Former squads

Coaching staff

Coaches 

  Ong Kim Swee (2010–2015)
  Razip Ismail (2015)
  Frank Bernhardt (2015–2017)
  Bojan Hodak (2017–2019)
  Brad Maloney (2019–2021)
  Hasan Sazali Waras (2022) 
  Norzaidi Rohmat (2023)

Honours

International
 FIFA U-20 World Cup
 Round 1 : 1997

Continental
 AFC U-19 Championship
 Runner-up (3) : 1959, 1960, 1968
 Third Place (2) : 1964, 1965

Regional
 AFF U-19 Youth Championship
 Winners (2) : 2018, 2022
 Runner-up (6) : 2003, 2005, 2006, 2007, 2017
 Third place (1) : 2011

Others 
International U-19 Thanh Niên Newspaper Cup:
 Runner-up  : 2022

See also 
 Malaysia national football team
 Malaysia women's national football team
 Malaysia national under-23 football team
 Malaysia national under-22 football team
 Malaysia national under-16 football team

References

External links 
 Football Association of Malaysia Official website
 FIFA profile: Malaysia / Fixtures & Results

Asian national under-19 association football teams
U-19